Sabbam Hari (1 June 1952 – 3 May 2021) was an Indian politician.

He served as Member of parliament, Lok Sabha, and was a Congress MP from Anakapalle constituency (elected 2009). Hari died from COVID-19 in May 2021.

Positions held
 Member of Parliament in 15th Lok Sabha
 Member, Parliamentary Committee on Industry 
 Mayor, Visakha Municipal Corporation (VMC)

References 

1952 births
2021 deaths
Lok Sabha members from Andhra Pradesh
Politicians from Visakhapatnam
India MPs 2009–2014
Deaths from the COVID-19 pandemic in India
Indian National Congress politicians from Andhra Pradesh